Vasiev is a surname. Notable people with the surname include:

Dilshod Vasiev (born 1988), Tajikistani footballer
Farkhod Vasiev (born 1990), Tajikistani footballer

See also
Vasev